Erigeron utahensis is a North American species of flowering plant in the family Asteraceae known by the common name Utah fleabane.

Erigeron utahensis is native to the western United States in Arizona, Utah, western Colorado, northwestern New Mexico, and southeastern California (Providence Mountains inside Mojave National Preserve in San Bernardino County).

Erigeron utahensis  is a perennial herb up to 60 cm (2 feet) tall, growing from a stout taproot and a branching underground caudex. Its branching stem and leaves are covered in whitish hairs. The inflorescence holds 1-5 flower heads, each 1-2 centimeters (0.4-0.8 inches) wide. They have yellow disc florets in the centers and 28–40 white, pink, lavender, or ray florets around the edges.

References

External links
Jepson Manual Treatment
United States Department of AgriculturePlants Profile
Calphotos Photo gallery, University of California
Lady Bird Johnson Wildflower Center, University of Texas
United States Department of the Interior, National Park Service, Arches National Park, Utah Daisy, Erigeron utahensis

utahensis
Flora of the Western United States
Plants described in 1880
Flora without expected TNC conservation status